Partage is an album that was released by the Cameroonian singer Michael Kiessou on April 2, 2014, worldwide. A deluxe version of the EP was released worldwide on August 29, 2015,  and was distributed by  Sony Music Entertainment via The Orchard (company). The EP  is a walk of more than an hour in the heart of African rhythms revisited and modernized by Michael and his team Kiessou orchestration. Thereby emerge new musical variations such the Kwatt'nB & the Neo Bend-skin. Alongside these crossbreeding, Michael browsed through new genres from elsewhere as Afropop and even Electronic dance music.

It has 15 tracks with diverse inspirations from Bend-skin to Afropop to Afrobeats. Many collaborations are found in the album some with young rising Cameroonians  stars (Locko, C-Prime, Edel Koula, Nigerians). Top Cameroonian music producers such as Philjohn, Mister Kriss, Bill Nyame  and musicians like Christian Obam, Ben Bass, Michel Mbarga also worked on the EP. The main tracks were recorded in Ghetto Music Studios (Messa, Yaoundé) and Believe Reocordz (Cité Sic, Douala); mixed and mastered by Christophe Avom.

Background
In 2013 after signing to Hope Music Group, Michael returned working to studios and focusing on his new music. Produced by Philjohn, Abele was released on July 17, 2013, and became the first single from the EP. Michael through the video concept, honored the festive movement found in Littoral Region (Cameroon) marked a happy event. To support this move, Michael also paid tribute to the famous Sam Fan Thomas's "Makassi dance" . The video was directed by NS Pictures and world exclusive premier on the Jambo show of Canal 2 International the 28 July 2013 and YouTube on August 3, 2013.

Track listing

References

2015 albums
Albums by Cameroonian artists